Seyyed Mohammad (also Romanized as Seyyed Moḩammad; also known as Emāmzādeh Seyyed Moḩammad) is a village in Manj Rural District, Manj District, Lordegan County, Chaharmahal and Bakhtiari Province, Iran. At the 2006 census, its population was 606, in 109 families.

References 

Populated places in Lordegan County